The NZR G Class was a class of four saddle tank locomotives from English builders Black Hawthorn in the early 1870s. Like the similarly sized D class, they were an attempt to produce a passenger version of the already highly successful F class.

Origin and design

The G class were ordered by the Canterbury Provincial Council. They were derived from the F class, replacing the first of the three driving axles with a four-wheel bogie. It was hoped that the reduced rigid wheelbase would allow the locomotive to provide higher speed passenger services. The type suffered from lack of weight on the driving axles, a driver stating that "it took the 'G' all its time to push its front bogie along, let alone pull a load". They were followed by the L Class which were a more successful attempt to produce a faster F Class.

Service

In the early 1890s the locomotives were progressively transferred to the Picton section, where it was felt that they had been relegated to get rid of them from the busy Hurunui-Bluff section. Their maximum load on the 1 in 37 gradient from Picton was six 4-wheel wagons.

Withdrawal and disposal

All of the locomotives were withdrawn between 1915 and 1919 and were sold for further service in industry.

See also
 NZR F class
 NZR FA / FB
 NZR L class
 NZR LA class
 Locomotives of New Zealand

References

Citations

Bibliography

Lloyd, W.G. (2002); Register of New Zealand Railways Steam Locomotives 1863-1971, Otago Railway & Locomotive Society/Triple M Publications
 
W.W.Stewart (1970), When Steam Was King, REED
 

Steam locomotives of New Zealand
Scrapped locomotives
Railway locomotives introduced in 1874
3 ft 6 in gauge locomotives of New Zealand